

Events

January–February 

 January 20 – George V of the United Kingdom and the British Dominions and Emperor of India, dies at his Sandringham Estate. The Prince of Wales succeeds to the throne of the United Kingdom as King Edward VIII.
 January 28 – Britain's King George V state funeral takes place in London and Windsor. He is buried at St George's Chapel, Windsor Castle
 February 4 – Radium E (bismuth-210) becomes the first radioactive element to be made synthetically.
 February 6 – The IV Olympic Winter Games open in Garmisch-Partenkirchen, Germany.
 February 10–19 – Second Italo-Ethiopian War: Battle of Amba Aradam – Italian forces gain a decisive tactical victory, effectively neutralizing the army of the Ethiopian Empire.
 February 16 – 1936 Spanish general election: The left-wing Popular Front coalition takes a majority.
 February 26 – February 26 Incident (二・二六事件, Niniroku Jiken): The Imperial Way Faction engineers a failed coup against the Japanese government; some politicians are killed.

March–April 

 March 1 – Construction of Hoover Dam is completed in the United States.
 March 7 – In violation of the Treaty of Versailles and Locarno Treaties, Nazi Germany reoccupies the Rhineland. Hitler and other Nazis later admit that the French army alone could have destroyed the Wehrmacht.
 March 9 – Pro-democratic militarist Keisuke Okada steps down as Prime Minister of Japan, and is replaced by radical militarist Kōki Hirota.
 March 15 – Austrian ski jumper Josef Bradl set the world record at 101.5 metres (333 ft) on Bloudkova velikanka hill in Planica and became the first man in history, to stand jump over one hundred metres.
 April 5 – A tornado hits Tupelo, Mississippi, killing 216 people and injuring over 700 (the 4th deadliest tornado in U.S. history).
 April 15 – The Tulkarm shooting begins the 1936–1939 Arab revolt in Palestine against the British government, and opposition to Jewish immigration.

May–June 

 May 5 – March of the Iron Will: Italian forces occupy Addis Ababa unopposed.
 May 7 – Italy annexes Ethiopia.
 May 9 – Italian East Africa is formed from the Italian territories of Eritrea, Ethiopia, and Italian Somaliland.
 May 12 – The Santa Fe railroad in the United States inaugurates the all-Pullman Super Chief passenger train, between Chicago and Los Angeles.
 May 25 – The Remington Rand strike of 1936–37 begins, spawning the notorious Mohawk Valley formula, a corporate plan for strikebreaking.
 May 27 – British luxury liner  leaves Southampton on her maiden voyage across the Atlantic.
 June 19 – Max Schmeling knocks out Joe Louis in the 12th round of their heavyweight boxing match, at Yankee Stadium in New York City.
 June 19 – Per Albin Hansson resigns as Prime Minister of Sweden, over the issue of defence policy. He is replaced by the leader of the Farmer's League (Bondeförbundet) Axel Pehrsson-Bramstorp, who also becomes Minister of Agriculture.
 June 19 – The total solar eclipse of June 19, 1936 is visible in Greece, Turkey, Russia and Japan. It is part of Solar Saros 126; Gamma is a value of 0.53889.
 June 26 – Focke-Wulf Fw 61, the first fully controllable helicopter, makes its maiden flight.

July–August 

 July 4 – First publication recognizing stress as a biological condition.
 July 17 – The Spanish Army of Africa launches a coup d'état against the Second Spanish Republic, beginning the Spanish Civil War.
 July 20 – The Montreux Convention Regarding the Regime of the Straits is signed in Montreux, allowing Turkey to fortify the Dardanelles and the Bosphorus, but guaranteeing free passage to ships of all nations in peacetime.
 August 1 – The 1936 Summer Olympics open in Berlin, Germany, and mark the first live television coverage of an international sports event in world history (John Logie Baird had previously broadcast the Derby horse race in Britain in 1931).
 August 3 – 1936 Summer Olympics: African-American athlete Jesse Owens wins the 100-meter dash.
 August 4 – A self-coup is staged by Greek Prime Minister Ioannis Metaxas, marking the beginning of the authoritarian 4th of August Regime, which will rule Greece until the Axis occupation of Greece in 1941.
 August 26 – The Anglo-Egyptian Treaty of 1936 is signed.

September–October 

 September 4–5 – English-born aviator Beryl Markham becomes the first woman to make an east-to-west solo transatlantic flight, from Abingdon-on-Thames, England, to Baleine, Nova Scotia.
 September 5 – Spanish Civil War: Robert Capa's photograph The Falling Soldier is taken.
 September 7 – The last known thylacine ("Tasmanian tiger"), named Benjamin, dies in Hobart Zoo in Tasmania.
 September 9
1936 Naval Revolt (Portugal): The crews of Portuguese Navy frigate NRP Afonso de Albuquerque and destroyer Dão mutiny while anchored in Lisbon Harbour. Opposed to the Salazar dictatorship's support of General Franco's coup in Spain, they declare their solidarity with the Second Spanish Republic.
The Franco-Syrian Treaty of Independence is signed.
 September 10 – The first World Speedway Championship is held at Wembley Stadium in London, England. It is won by Australian Lionel Van Praag, with Englishman Eric Langton second and Australian Bluey Wilkinson third.
 September 13 – In response to a polio outbreak, Chicago Public Schools launches a distance education program which constitutes the first large-scale use of radio broadcasts to facilitate distance education.
 September 28 – After the election to the Swedish Riksdag's second chamber, Axel Pehrsson-Bramstorp and his "Holiday Cabinet" ("Semesterregeringen") resign (though he remains as Minister of Agriculture) and Per Albin Hansson returns as Prime Minister, staying in office until his death from a heart attack in 1946.
 October
 Joseph Stalin's Great Purge begins in the Soviet Union.
 The Mästermyr chest is discovered in the Mästermyr mire (after which it is later named), west of Hemse, on the island of Gotland, Sweden.
 October 19 – H.R. Ekins, reporter for the New York World-Telegram, wins a race to travel around the world on commercial airline flights, beating Dorothy Kilgallen of the New York Journal and Leo Kieran of The New York Times. The flight takes 18 days.
 October 25 – The Rome-Berlin Axis is formed.

November–December 

 November 2
 The BBC launches the world's first regular television service in high-definition (according to contemporary standards).
 The Canadian Broadcasting Corporation (CBC) begins radio in Canada.
 November 3 – 1936 United States presidential election: Franklin D. Roosevelt is reelected to a second term, in a landslide victory over Kansas Governor Alf Landon; farmers support Roosevelt.
 November 9 – American fashion designer Ruth Harkness encounters and captures a nine-week-old panda cub in Sichuan, China; it becomes the first live giant panda to enter the United States.
 November 12 – In California, the San Francisco–Oakland Bay Bridge opens to traffic.
 November 20 – A levee failure and continued massive rain at the Mitsubishi Osarizawa mine, Kazuno, northeastern Akita, Japan, results in at least 375 deaths.
 November 23 – Cover date of the first issue of Life, a weekly news magazine launched in the United States under the management of Henry Luce.
 November 25 – The Anti-Comintern Pact is signed by Germany and Japan.
 November 30 – A spectacular fire destroys The Crystal Palace in London, originally built for the 1851 Great Exhibition.
 December 3 – Radio station WQXR is officially founded in New York City.
 December 5 – The 1936 Soviet Constitution, promulgated by Stalin, is adopted in the Soviet Union. The Transcaucasian Socialist Federative Soviet Republic is dissolved, and Armenia, Azerbaijan, and Georgia become full Republics of the Soviet Union.
 December 7 – Streptococcous meningitis (a condition previously 99% fatal) is successfully treated for the first time with a sulfonamide.
 December 10 – Edward VIII abdication crisis: King Edward VIII of the United Kingdom signs an instrument of abdication at Fort Belvedere, Surrey in the presence of his three brothers, The Duke of York, The Duke of Gloucester and The Duke of Kent.
 December 11
 Edward VIII abdication crisis: The British Parliament passes His Majesty's Declaration of Abdication Act 1936 on behalf of the U.K., Australia, New Zealand and South Africa. The King performs his last act as sovereign by giving Royal Assent to the Act, and his brother Prince Albert, Duke of York, becomes King, reigning as King George VI. The abdicated King, now HRH Prince Edward, makes a broadcast to the nation explaining his decision to abdicate, and leaves the country for Austria.
 Taking the opportunity to free itself further from ties to the United Kingdom, the Oireachtas of the Irish Free State passes the Constitution (Amendment No. 27) Act 1936, removing most powers from the office of Governor-General of the Irish Free State, and the Executive Authority (External Relations) Act 1936 (signed into law December 12), assenting to the abdication and restricting the power of the monarch in relation to Ireland to international affairs.
 December 12 – Xi'an Incident: Generalissimo Chiang Kai-shek of the Republic of China is kidnapped by Marshal Zhang Xueliang.
 December 24 – The first filmed Russian opera, Natalka Poltavka, is released in Ukraine.
 December 28 – The Flint sit-down strike begins, a six-week standoff that would result in the recognition of the United Auto Workers by General Motors.

Date unknown 
 West China Famine: An estimated five million people die.
 Nestlé introduce the white chocolate Milkybar (called Galak in Continental Europe and elsewhere).

Births

January 

 January 2 – Roger Miller, American singer, songwriter, musician and actor (d. 1992)
 January 6
 Darlene Hard, American tennis player (d. 2021)
 Alejandro Maldonado, Guatemalan politician 
 Julio María Sanguinetti, 2-time President of Uruguay
 January 8 – Robert May, Australian scientist (d. 2020)
 January 10
 Stephen E. Ambrose, American historian and biographer (d. 2002)
 Robert Wilson, American physicist, radio astronomer, and Nobel laureate
 January 11 – Eva Hesse, American artist (d. 1970)
 January 12 – Émile Lahoud, 15th President of Lebanon
 January 14 – Reiner Klimke, German equestrian (d. 1999)
 January 19 – Ziaur Rahman, 7th President of Bangladesh (d. 1981)
 January 22
 Alan J. Heeger, American physicist
 Ong Teng Cheong, 5th President of Singapore (d. 2002)
 January 25 – Diana Hyland, American actress (d. 1977)
 January 27
 Barry Barish, American gravitational physicist, Nobel laureate
 Troy Donahue, American actor (d. 2001)
 Samuel C. C. Ting, American physicist
 January 28
 Waldyr Boccardo, Brazilian basketball player (d. 2018)
 Alan Alda, American actor, director, screenwriter, comedian and author
 Ismail Kadare, Albanian writer

February 

 February 3 – Bob Simpson, Australian cricketer
 February 4 – David Brenner, American actor and comedian (d. 2014)
 February 6
 Kent Douglas, Canadian ice hockey player, coach (d. 2009)
 Stompin' Tom Connors, Canadian country and folk singer-songwriter (d. 2013)
 February 9
 Callistus Ndlovu, Zimbabwean politician (d. 2019)
 Clive Swift, British actor (d. 2019)
 February 11 – Burt Reynolds, American actor, director and producer (d. 2018)
 February 14 – Anna German, Polish singer (d. 1982)
 February 16 – Carl Icahn, American businessman, investor and philanthropist
 February 17 – Jim Brown, African-American football player and actor
 February 21 – Barbara Jordan, African-American lawyer, educator, politician and civil rights activist (d. 1996)
 February 24 — Carol D'Onofrio, American public health researcher (d. 2020)
 February 26 – Adem Demaçi, Albanian politician, writer (d. 2018)
 February 29
 Alex Rocco, American actor (d. 2015)
 Jack Lousma, American astronaut and politician
 Henri Richard, Canadian ice hockey player (d. 2020)

March 

 March 4
 Jim Clark, Scottish race car driver (d. 1968)
 Kim Yong-chun, North Korean soldier, politician (d. 2018)
 Aribert Reimann, German composer
 March 5
 Canaan Banana, 1st President of Zimbabwe (d. 2003)
 Dean Stockwell, American actor (d. 2021)
 March 6
 Marion Barry, African-American civil rights activist and politician (d. 2014)
 Choummaly Sayasone, 5th President of Laos
 March 7
 Loren Acton, American astronaut
 Julio Terrazas Sandoval, Bolivian cardinal (d. 2015)
 March 9 – Mickey Gilley, American country singer (d. 2022)
 March 10 – Sepp Blatter, Swiss sports administrator, president of FIFA
 March 11
 Harald zur Hausen, German virologist
 Takis Mousafiris, Greek composer and songwriter
 Antonin Scalia, Associate Justice of the Supreme Court of the United States (d. 2016)
 March 13 – Mónica Miguel, Mexican actress, director and singer (d. 2020)
 March 17 – Ken Mattingly, American astronaut
 March 18 – F. W. de Klerk, 7th and last State President of South Africa (d. 2021)
 March 19 – Ursula Andress, Swiss actress
 March 20 – Lee "Scratch" Perry, Jamaican musician (d. 2021)
 March 21 – Seyyed Mehdi Tabatabaei, Iranian politician (d. 2018)
 March 27 – Banwari Lal Joshi, Indian politician (d. 2017)
 March 28
 Bill Gaither, American musician
 Mario Vargas Llosa, Peruvian writer, politician, journalist and essayist, Nobel Prize laureate
 Amancio Ortega Gaona, Spanish business tycoon

April 

 April 1
 Jean-Pascal Delamuraz, 2-time President of Switzerland (d. 1998)
 Leo Posada, Cuban baseball player (d. 2022)
 April 7 – Princess Elizabeth of Yugoslavia, Yugoslav princess, Serbian princess, Serbian presidential candidate
 April 9
 Valerie Solanas, American feminist writer who attempted to kill Andy Warhol (d. 1988)
 Ferdinando Imposimato, Italian judge (d. 2018)
 April 12 – Charles Napier, American character actor (d. 2011)
 April 13 – Choi In-hun, South Korean writer (d. 2018)
 April 14 – Dilbagh Singh Kler, Malaysian Olympic athlete (d. 2012)
 April 15
 Pen Sovan, Cambodian politician (d. 2016)
 Raymond Poulidor, French road-bicycle racer（d. 2019）
 April 17 – Urs Wild, Swiss chemist
 April 20 – Alfonso, Duke of Anjou and Cádiz (d. 1989)
 April 22 – Glen Campbell, American singer and actor (d. 2017)
 April 23 – Roy Orbison, American singer, songwriter (Pretty Woman) (d. 1988)
 April 24
 Akwasi Afrifa, 3rd Head of State of Ghana (d. 1979)
 Jill Ireland, English actress (d. 1990)
 April 28 – Tariq Aziz, Iraqi politician (d. 2015)
 April 29 – Jacob Rothschild, 4th Baron Rothschild, British financier and aristocrat

May 

 May 1 – Danièle Huillet, French filmmaker (d. 2006)
 May 2
 Norma Aleandro, Argentinian actress
 Engelbert Humperdinck (b. Arnold George Dorsey), British singer
 May 4 – El Cordobés, Spanish matador
 May 5 – Trần Đức Lương, 5th President of Vietnam
 May 7 – Jimmy Ruffin, African-American singer (d. 2014)
 May 9
 Albert Finney, English actor (d. 2019)
 Glenda Jackson, English actress and politician
 Ernest Shonekan, 9th Head of State of Nigeria (d. 2022)
 May 12
 Klaus Doldinger, German musician
 Guillermo Endara, 32nd President of Panama (1989–1994) (d. 2009)
 May 13 – Rafael Campos, Dominican actor (d. 1985)
 May 14 – Bobby Darin, American singer (d. 1973)
 May 16
 Philippe de Montebello, art exhibitionist
 Karl Lehmann, German Catholic cardinal (d. 2018)
 May 17 – Dennis Hopper, American actor and director (d. 2010)
 May 20
 Nickey Iyambo, Namibian politician, 1st Vice-President of Namibia (d. 2019)
 Antanas Vaupšas, Lithuanian athlete (d. 2017)
 May 21 – Günter Blobel, German-American biologist, academic and Nobel Prize laureate (d. 2018)
 May 23 – Charles Kimbrough, American actor (d. 2023)
 May 25 – Tom T. Hall, American country singer-songwriter (d. 2021)
 May 27 – Louis Gossett Jr., African-American actor

June 

June 2 – Volodymyr Holubnychy, Soviet Olympic athlete (d. 2021)
June 3 – Colin Meads, New Zealand rugby union player (d. 2017)
June 4
Bruce Dern, American actor
Nutan Samarth, Indian actress (d. 1991)
June 8
James Darren, American actor and singer
Kenneth G. Wilson, American Nobel Prize-winning physicist (d. 2013)
June 15 – William Levada, American cardinal (d. 2019)
June 17 – Ken Loach, British film director
June 18
Denny Hulme, New Zealand racing driver (d. 1992)
Barack Obama Sr., Kenyan economist (d. 1982)
June 19 – Takeshi Aono, Japanese actor (d. 2012)
June 22
Kris Kristofferson, American actor, singer and songwriter
Izatullo Khayoyev, 1st Prime Minister of Tajikistan (d. 2015)
Ferran Olivella, Spanish footballer
Hermeto Pascoal, Brazilian composer and multi-instrumentalist
June 23 – Costas Simitis, Greek politician, 78th Prime Minister of Greece
June 25 – B. J. Habibie, Indonesian politician, 3rd President of Indonesia (d. 2019)
June 26
Hal Greer, African-American professional basketball player (d. 2018)
Lee Ming-liang, Taiwanese geneticist
Jean-Claude Turcotte, Canadian cardinal (d. 2015)
June 27
Geneviève Fontanel, French stage, film actress (d. 2018)
Joe Doyle, Irish politician (d. 2009)
June 28 – Leon O. Chua, American electrical engineer and computer scientist
June 29
David Jenkins, American figure skater
Eddie Mabo, Australian Indigenous rights activist (d. 1992)
Kigeli V of Rwanda, last king of Rwanda (d. 2016)
June 30 – Assia Djebar, Algerian writer (d. 2015)

July 

 July 1
 Mihir Rakshit, Indian economist
 E. Ponnuswamy, Indian politician
 Antonio Salines, Italian actor and director (d. 2021)
 July 4 – Günter Vetter, Austrian politician (d. 2022)
 July 5
 Sir Frederick Ballantyne, Governor-General of Saint Vincent and the Grenadines (d. 2020)
 Shirley Knight, American actress (d. 2020)
 Sir James Mirrlees, Scottish-born economist, winner of the 1996 Nobel Memorial Prize in Economic Sciences (d. 2018)
 July 7
Hammoudi Al-Harithi, Iraqi actor
 Anatoly Kirov, Soviet wrestler
 July 8 – Johan Du Preez, Rhodesian-Zimbabwean sprinter
 July 14 – Marisa Allasio, Italian actress
 July 16
 Miria Obote, former First Lady of Uganda
 Venkataraman Subramanya, Indian cricketer
 Leo Sterckx, Belgian cyclist
 Yasuo Fukuda, 58th Prime Minister of Japan
 July 18 – Ted Harris, Canadian ice hockey player
 July 26 – Neelu, Indian actor (d. 2018)
 July 30
 Infanta Pilar, Duchess of Badajoz, Spanish royal (d. 2020)
 Buddy Guy, African-American blues singer and guitarist

August 

August 1
Yves Saint Laurent, Algerian-born French fashion designer (d. 2008)
Chadlia Fahrat Essebsi, Tunisian consort, 5th First Lady of Tunisia (d. 2019)
August 4 – Joaquim Roriz, Brazilian politician (d. 2018)
August 12
Kjell Grede, Swedish film director (d. 2017)
André Kolingba, President of Central African Republic (d. 2010)
August 17 – Margaret Hamilton, American computer scientist, systems engineer, and business owner
August 18
Hifikepunye Pohamba, 2nd President of Namibia
Robert Redford, American actor and film director
August 21
Wilt Chamberlain, African-American basketball player (d. 1999)
Luisa Isabel Álvarez de Toledo, 21st Duchess of Medina Sidonia, (d. 2008)
August 23 – Rudy Lewis, American rhythm and blues singer (d. 1964)
August 25 – Giridharilal Kedia, Indian former Working President of KVK (d. 2009)
August 26 – Benedict Anderson, American academic (d. 2015)
August 27 – Lien Chan, Taiwanese politician
August 28 – Bert Schneider, Austrian road racer (d. 2009)
August 29 – John McCain, American politician, U.S. Senator (R-Az.) (d. 2018)
August 31 – Fabrizia Ramondino, Italian author (d. 2008)

September 

 September 1 – Valery Legasov, Soviet inorganic chemist (d. 1988)
 September 2 – Andrew Grove, Hungarian-American businessman, engineer and author (d. 2016)
 September 3 – Zine El Abidine Ben Ali, 2nd President of Tunisia (d. 2019)
 September 4
 Kamuta Latasi, 4th Prime Minister of Tuvalu
 Yoshihisa Yoshikawa, Japanese sport shooter (d. 2019)
 September 7
 Bruce Gray, Puerto Rican/Canadian actor (d. 2017)
 Buddy Holly, American rock-and-roll singer, songwriter, and musician (d. 1959)
 Jorge Porcel, Argentine-American actor (d. 2006)
 September 14 – Walter Koenig, American actor (Star Trek: The Original Series)
 September 15 – Ashley Cooper, Australian tennis player (d. 2020)
 September 19 – Al Oerter, American Olympic athlete (d. 2007)
 September 21 – Yury Luzhkov, mayor of Moscow (d. 2019)
 September 22 – Owen Roizman, American cinematographer (d. 2023)
 September 23 – Valentín Paniagua, President of Perú (d. 2006)
 September 24 – Jim Henson, American puppeteer, filmmaker, and television producer  (The Muppets) (d. 1990)
 September 25 – Moussa Traoré, President of Mali (d. 2020)
 September 26 – Winnie Madikizela-Mandela, South African anti-apartheid activist (d. 2018)
 September 27 – Joselo, Venezuelan actor, comedian (d. 2013)
 September 28 – Robert Wolders, Dutch actor (d. 2018)
 September 29 – Silvio Berlusconi, 50th Prime Minister of Italy, media entrepreneur

October 

 October 1 – Duncan Edwards, English footballer (d. 1958)
 October 3 – Steve Reich, American composer
 October 5 – Václav Havel, Czech playwright, writer and politician, 10th President of Czechoslovakia and 1st President of the Czech Republic (d. 2011)
 October 6 – Lin Yu-lin, Taiwanese billionaire real estate developer (d. 2018)
 October 7 – Fereydoun Farrokhzad, Iranian entertainer (d. 1992)
 October 8 – Rogelio Guerra, Mexican actor (d. 2018)
 October 9 – Brian Blessed, English actor
 October 10 – Gerhard Ertl, German physicist, Nobel laureate
 October 13 – Christine Nöstlinger, Austrian writer (d. 2018)
 October 16 - Matt Brennan, Irish politician, Fianna Fáil (1982-2002)
 October 18 – Jaime Lucas Ortega y Alamino, Cuban cardinal (d. 2019)
 October 19 – James Bevel, Civil Rights Movement strategist

 October 22 – Bobby Seale, American political activist
 October 24 – Bill Wyman, British musician
 October 25 – Masako Nozawa, Japanese actress and voice actress
 October 26
 Etelka Kenéz Heka, Hungarian writer, poet, singer
 Shelley Morrison, American actress (d. 2019)
 October 28 – Charlie Daniels, American country singer, and songwriter (d. 2020)
 October 30 – Polina Astakhova, Soviet artistic gymnast (d. 2005)
 October 31 – Michael Landon, American actor, director, producer and writer (d. 1991)

November 

 November 3 – Roy Emerson, Australian tennis player
 November 4 – Didier Ratsiraka, 3rd President of Madagascar (d. 2021)
 November 5
 Ivan Stambolić, Serbian politician (d. 2000)
 Uwe Seeler, German football player and manager (d. 2022)
 November 8 – Virna Lisi, Italian actress (d. 2014)
 November 9
 Mary Travers, American singer-songwriter (d. 2009)
 Stephanie Rothman, American film director
 November 11 – Susan Kohner, American actress
 November 17
 Lazarus Salii, 3rd President of Palau (d. 1988)
 Dahlia Ravikovitch, Israeli poet (d. 2005)
 November 19 – Dick Cavett, American talk show host, television personality
 November 20 – Don DeLillo, American author
 November 22 – John Bird, British satirist, actor and comedian (d. 2022)
 November 23
 Robert Barnard, English writer (d. 2013)
 Lazarus Salii, 3rd President of Palau (d. 1988)
 Steve Landesberg, actor and comedian (d. 2010)
 November 30 
 Abbie Hoffman, American political and social activist (d. 1989)
 Eric Walter Elst, Belgian astronomer (d. 2022)

December 

December 4 – América Alonso, Venezuelan actress (d. 2022)
December 5 – James Lee Burke, American author
December 7 – Martha Layne Collins, American businesswoman and politician
December 8 – David Carradine, American actor, director and martial artist (d. 2009)
December 9 – A. B. Yehoshua, Israeli writer (d. 2022)
December 11 – Hans van den Broek, Dutch politician and diplomat
December 12
Iolanda Balaș, Romanian high jumper (d. 2016)
Reggie Young, American musician and guitarist (d. 2019)
December 14 – Robert A. Parker, American physicist, astronomer, and astronaut
December 17
Pope Francis, Argentine-born Catholic Pontiff
Klaus Kinkel, German politician (d. 2019)
Tommy Steele, British entertainer
December 20 – Niki Bettendorf, Luxembourgian politician (d. 2018)
December 21 – Barbara Roberts, American politician
December 22 – Héctor Elizondo, American actor
December 23
La Lupe, Cuban singer (d. 1992)
Frederic Forrest, American actor
December 25
Princess Alexandra, The Honourable Lady Ogilvy
Ismail Merchant, Indian film director and producer (d. 2005)
December 27 – Alex Miller, Australian novelist
December 29
Mary Tyler Moore, American actress, producer and diabetes awareness activist (d. 2017)
Peep Janes, Estonian architect
Ray Nitschke, American football player (d. 1998)
December 31 – Siw Malmkvist, Swedish singer

Deaths

January 

 January 1 – Harry B. Smith, American composer (b. 1860)
 January 5 – Ramón del Valle-Inclán, Spanish writer (b. 1866)
 January 6 – Louise Bryant, American journalist (b. 1885)
 January 9 – John Gilbert, American actor (b. 1897)
 January 15
 Henry Foster, British Conservative Party politician, former Governor-General of Australia (b. 1866)
 George Landenberger, United States Navy Captain, 23rd Governor of American Samoa (b. 1879)
 January 16 – Albert Fish, American serial killer (executed) (b. 1870)
 January 18 – Rudyard Kipling, British writer, Nobel Prize laureate (b. 1865)
 January 20 – King George V of the United Kingdom (b. 1865)
 January 23 – John Mills Jr., "Mills Brothers" basso, guitarist (b. 1911)
 January 24
Harry T. Morey, American actor (b. 1873)
Harry Peach, British furniture manufacturer, social campaigner (b. 1874)
 January 28 – Richard Loeb, American murderer (b. 1905)

February 

 February 3 – Sophie, Princess of Albania, consort of William of Wied, Prince of Albania (b.1885)
 February 4 – Wilhelm Gustloff, German leader of the Swiss Nazi Party (b. 1895)
 February 8 – Charles Curtis, 31st Vice President of the United States (b. 1860)
 February 9 – Callistus Ndlovu, Zimbabwean academic and politician (b. 1936)
 February 19 – Billy Mitchell, American general, military aviation pioneer (b. 1879)
 February 20
 Max Schreck, German actor (b. 1879)
 Georges Vacher de Lapouge, French anthropologist (b. 1854)
 February 23 – William Adamson, British Labour politician (b. 1863)
 February 26 – in the "February 26 Incident":
 Takahashi Korekiyo, 11th Prime Minister of Japan (b. 1854)
 Saitō Makoto, Japanese admiral, 19th Prime Minister of Japan (b. 1858)
 February 27
 Ivan Pavlov, Russian psychologist, recipient of the Nobel Prize in Physiology or Medicine (b. 1849)
 Mulugeta Yeggazu, Ethiopian government official, military leader
Fred Haines, American film director and screenwriter
 February 28 – Charles Nicolle, French bacteriologist, recipient of the Nobel Prize in Physiology or Medicine (b. 1866)

March 
 March 8  – Jean Patou, French fashion designer (b. 1880)
 March 9 – Swami Sri Yukteswar Giri, Indian monk and yogi (b. 1855)
 March 12
 David Beatty, 1st Earl Beatty, British admiral (b. 1871)
 Sir David Campbell, British army general and Governor of Malta (b. 1869)
 March 13 – Sir Francis Bell, 20th Prime Minister of New Zealand (b. 1851)
 March 16
 Dace Akmentiņa, Latvian actress (b. 1858)
 Marguerite Durand, French journalist, feminist leader (b. 1864)
 March 18 – Eleftherios Venizelos, Greek statesman, several times Prime Minister (b. 1864)
 March 20 –  Herman P. Faris, American temperance movement leader (b. 1858)
 March 21 – Alexander Glazunov, Russian composer, conductor (b. 1865)
 March 23 – Oscar Asche, Australian actor (b. 1871)
 March 28 – Sir Archibald Garrod, English physician (b. 1857)
 March 29 – Eugène Marais, South African lawyer, naturalist, poet and writer (b. 1871)

April 

 April 2 – Alberico Albricci, Italian general (b. 1864)
 April 3 – Richard Hauptmann, German killer of Charles Lindbergh Jr. (executed) (b. 1899)
 April 6 – Edmund Breese, American actor (b. 1871)
 April 7 – Marilyn Miller, American actress (b. 1898)
 April 8 – Róbert Bárány, Austrian physician, recipient of the Nobel Prize in Physiology or Medicine (b. 1876)
 April 9 – Ferdinand Tönnies, German sociologist, economist and philosopher (b. 1855)
 April 18 – Ottorino Respighi, Italian composer, musicologist, and conductor (b. 1879)
 April 23 – Teresa de la Parra, Venezuelan writer (b. 1889)
 April 25 – Wajed Ali Khan Panni, Bengali aristocrat and philanthropist (b. 1871)
 April 26 – Tammany Young, American actor (b. 1886)
 April 28 – King Fuad I of Egypt (b. 1868)
 April 30 – A. E. Housman, English poet (b. 1859)

May 
 May 2 – Ivan Alexandrov, Russian engineer (b. 1875)
 May 4 – Ludwig von Falkenhausen, German general (b. 1844)
 May 5 – Marianne Hainisch, Austrian women's rights activist (b. 1839)
 May 8 – Oswald Spengler, German philosopher (b. 1880)
May 12 – Hu Hanmin, Chinese politician (b. 1879)
 May 14 – Edmund Allenby, 1st Viscount Allenby, British soldier, administrator (b. 1861)
 May 16 – Leonidas Paraskevopoulos, Greek general, senator (b. 1860)
 May 17 – Panagis Tsaldaris, Prime Minister of Greece (b. 1868)
 May 24 – Khaz'al Khan Ibn Haji Jabir Khan, Iranian emir (b. 1863)
 May 29 – Norman Chaney, American actor (b. 1914)

June 

 June 3 – Walther Wever, German general, Luftwaffe commander (b. 1887)
 June 6 – James Darren, American actor
 June 11 – Robert E. Howard, American author (suicide) (b. 1906)
 June 12 – Karl Krays, Austrian writer, journalist (b. 1874)
 June 13 – Marie-Louise Bouglé, French feminist, librarian, and archivist (b. 1883)
 June 14 – G. K. Chesterton, English author (b. 1874)
 June 17 – Henry B. Walthall, American actor (b. 1878)
 June 18 – Maxim Gorky, Russian writer (b. 1868)
 June 19 – Sir William Hall-Jones, English-New Zealand politician, 16th Prime Minister of New Zealand (b. 1851)
 June 22
 Mary Haviland Stilwell Kuesel, American pioneer dentist (b. 1866)
 Moritz Schlick, German philosopher, physicist (b. 1882)
 June 28 – Alexander Berkman, Russian anarchist (b. 1870)

July 

 July 1 – Hovhannes Abelian, Armenian actor (b. 1865)
 July 8 – Thomas Meighan, American actor (b. 1879)
 July 9 – Auguste Adib Pacha, two-time prime minister of Lebanon (b. 1859)
 July 11 – James Murray, American actor (b. 1901)
 July 13 
 Kojo Tovalou Houénou, Beninese critic of the French colonial empire in Africa (b. 1887)
 José Calvo Sotelo, Spanish politician (b. 1893)
 July 16 – Alan Crosland, American film director (b. 1894)
 July 20 – José Sanjurjo, Spanish general (b. 1872)
 July 23 – Anna Abrikosova, Soviet Roman Catholic religious sister and servant of God (b. 1882)
 July 24
 Georg Michaelis, 6th Chancellor of Germany (b. 1857)
 Sir Arnold Theiler, South African veterinary scientist (b. 1867)
 July 25 – Heinrich Rickert, German philosopher (b. 1863)

August 

 August 1 – Louis Blériot, French aviation pioneer (b. 1872)
 August 9 – Lincoln Steffens, American journalist (b. 1866)
 August 12
 Blessed Victoria Díez Bustos de Molina, Spanish teacher, religious woman (b. 1903)
 Manuel Goded, Spanish general (executed) (b. 1882)
 August 15 – Grazia Deledda, Italian writer, Nobel Prize laureate (b. 1871)
 August 19
 Federico García Lorca, Spanish writer (assassinated) (b. 1898)
 Hugh Patrick Lygon, English aristocrat (b. 1904)
 Oscar von Sydow, 18th Prime Minister of Sweden (b. 1873)
 August 22 – José María Hinojosa, Spanish poet (assassinated) (b. 1904)
 August 23 – Julio Ruiz de Alda, Spanish aviator, Falangist politician (executed) (b. 1897)
 August 25
 Ivan Nikitich Smirnov, Soviet Communist Party activist (b. 1881)
 Lev Kamenev, Soviet politician (b. 1883)
 Grigory Zinoviev, Soviet politician (b. 1883)

September 

 September 6 – Víctor Pradera Larumbe, Spanish political theorist (executed) (b. 1872)
 September 7 – Kenneth Balfour, British Conservative Party politician (b. 1863)
 September 14
 Irving Thalberg, American film producer (b. 1899)
 September 14 – Raoul Villain, French assassin (b. 1885)
 September 16 – Karl Buresch, 9th Chancellor of Austria (b. 1878)
 September 17 – Henri Louis Le Chatelier, French chemist (Le Chatelier's principle) (b. 1850)
 September 19 – Vishnu Narayan Bhatkhande, Indian musician (b. 1860)
 September 21
 Amalia Abad Casasempere, Spanish Roman Catholic laywoman, martyr (executed) (b. 1897)
 Antoine Meillet, French linguist (b. 1866)
 September 28 – William Sims, American admiral (b. 1858)
 September 30 – Friedrich Sixt von Armin, German general (b. 1851)

October 

 October 2 – Juho Sunila, 2-time Prime Minister of Finland (b. 1875)
 October 3 – John Heisman, American football coach (b. 1869)
 October 6 – Gyula Gömbös, 30th Prime Minister of Hungary (b. 1886)
 October 8
 Cheiro, Irish astrologer (b. 1866)
 William Henry Stark, American businessman (b. 1851)
 October 12 – Shuja ul-Mulk, Indian ruler (b. 1881)
 October 16 – Effie Adelaide Rowlands, British writer (b. 1859)
 October 19 – Lu Xun, leading figure of modern Chinese literature (b. 1881)
 October 20 – Anne Sullivan, American teacher of Helen Keller (b. 1866)
 October 26 – Rodney Heath, Australian tennis player (b. 1884)
 October 29 – Ramiro de Maeztu, Spanish writer (b. 1875)

November 

 November 2 – Martin Lowry, English physical chemist (b. 1874)
 November 7
 Walter L. Finn, American physician and politician (b. 1875)
 Charles "Chic" Sale, American vaudevillian (b. 1885)
 November 11 – Sir Edward German, English composer (b. 1862)
 November 17
 John Bowers, American actor (b. 1885)
 Alexandros Papanastasiou, 2-time prime minister of Greece (b. 1876)
 November 20
 Buenaventura Durruti, Spanish anarchist (b. 1896)
 José Antonio Primo de Rivera, Spanish fascist politician (b. 1903)
 November 25 – Andrew Harper, Scottish–Australian biblical scholar, teacher (b. 1844)
 November 27 – Edward Bach, British physician, homeopath and bacteriologist (b. 1886)

December 

 December 7 – Jean Mermoz, French aviator (b. 1901)
 December 9
 Juan de la Cierva, Spanish civil engineer, aviator, aeronautical engineer and inventor of the autogyro (b. 1895)
 Arvid Lindman, 12th Prime Minister of Sweden (b. 1862)
 Lottie Pickford, Canadian actress (b. 1895)
 December 10
 Bobby Abel, English cricketer (b. 1857)
 Luigi Pirandello, Italian writer, Nobel Prize laureate (b. 1867)
 December 18 – Leonardo Torres y Quevedo, Spanish engineer, mathematician (b. 1852)
 December 23 – William Henry Harrison, English cricketer (b. 1866)
 December 24 – Irene Fenwick, American actress (b. 1887)
 December 25 – Carl Stumpf, German philosopher, psychologist (b. 1848)
 December 26 – Percival G. Baldwin, American politician and businessman (b. 1880)
 December 27 – Mehmet Akif Ersoy, poet, writer, academic, politician, and the author of the Turkish National Anthem (b. 1873)
 December 29 – Lucy, Lady Houston, British philanthropist (b. 1857)
 December 31 – Miguel de Unamuno, Spanish writer (b. 1864)

Nobel Prizes 

 Physics – Victor F. Hess, Carl D. Anderson
 Chemistry – Petrus (Peter) Josephus Wilhelmus Debye
 Physiology or Medicine – Sir Henry Hallett Dale, Otto Loewi
 Literature – Eugene Gladstone O'Neill
 Peace – Carlos Saavedra Lamas

Note

References

External links 
 Headling America 1937 reprints the best American newspaper stories of 1935–1936.
 1936 WWII Timeline
 The 1930s Timeline: 1936 – from American Studies Programs at the University of Virginia

 
Leap years in the Gregorian calendar